Tomas Thordarson (born 1974) is a Danish-Icelandic singer, he won Dansk Melodi Grand Prix 2004 with the song "Shame on You". The song finished thirteenth place at semifinal and Denmark failed to qualify.

Musical career
Thordarson started his musical career at Blaagaard Statsseminarium. Then he joined a band which makes funk and soul music as a lead singer. In 2001 he participated in DR's TV program Star for a Night.

In 2004 he was nominated for LGBT Denmark's LGBT award in the category of gay of the year.

Personal life
Thordarson is openly gay.

He and his partner are in a registered partnership since 2003, and they had adopted a child since 2002.

References

1974 births
Living people
Eurovision Song Contest entrants for Denmark
Eurovision Song Contest entrants of 2004
20th-century Danish male singers
21st-century Icelandic male singers
People from Copenhagen
Icelandic gay musicians
Danish gay musicians
Danish LGBT singers
Icelandic LGBT singers
English-language singers from Denmark
Gay singers
21st-century Danish male singers
20th-century Danish LGBT people
21st-century Danish LGBT people